Gornja Vrba is a municipality in Brod-Posavina County, Croatia. There are 2,559 inhabitants in which 99% declare themselves Croats. (2001 census)

The people live in 2 naselja:

 Donja Vrba 
 Gornja Vrba

References
 

Municipalities of Croatia
Populated places in Brod-Posavina County